This is a list of cancelled games for the Atari Jaguar and Atari Jaguar CD.

List 
There are currently  games on this list.

See also 
 List of Atari Jaguar games
 List of Atari Jaguar homebrew games
 Lists of video games

Notes

References 

Atari Jaguar